Margaret Jeffrey Rioch (1907–1996) was an American psychotherapist, internationally known for her critical work in the field of psychology. She is best known for her role in establishing a new method of training for mental health counselors. Rioch's publications and projects have directly led to the current systems of mental health care treatment. Notable methods that have stemmed from her work include crisis hotlines and the use of support groups. She died in 1996 at the age of 89.

Biography

Education 
Margaret Rioch was born in 1907 in the city of Paterson, NJ. She graduated in the late 1920s, and obtained an undergraduate degree from Wellesley College, located in Wellesley Massachusetts. Following this, Rioch pursued a post graduate degree, and graduated with a doctorate in Philosophy from Bryn Mawr College in 1933.

Career 
After receiving her doctorate, Rioch began her career as an assistant professor at Wellesley College. During this period of time she met her husband, David Rioch M.D. She later became an employee at American University. While there, she focused on the practice of zen, eventually becoming trained in the art, and incorporating it into her methods of treatment. She collaborated with two influential artists, Suzuki and Buber, and there combined work most likely influenced her future interests in group dynamics.

In 1943 she began her most impactful leg of her career as a chairman and Professor of Neuropsychiatry at Washington University. During this period of time is when she began working at the National Institute of Mental Health (1960). Her studies focus on the training of future psychotherapy employees. As one of the few women in her discipline, Margaret became a pioneer for opening opportunities to more middle aged women. She believed that women, in particular mothers who have had experience raising children, had a greater capacity for nurturing and helping in the field of psychotherapy. Her training focused on creating jobs specifically for females in the psychology field, but later became the framework for all national psychotherapy training. This training focused on new methods of treating patients. In order to prove the validity of her training, she performed an experiment using eight 40-year-old women. The results concluded her training did in fact have the ability to certify carefully selected, mature adults as psychotherapists.

Additionally, Rioch famously helped found the internationally recognized A.K. Rice Institute for the Study of Social Systems (AKRI). This foundation studies group dynamics, initially focusing on finding which circumstances lead to irrational behavior among social groups. Studies done by the AKRI have made strides in understanding how social behaviors relate to an individuals persona. These types of studies are exactly what led to using social support groups as a mechanism to cope and heal during times of crisis.

Published works

 Jarl E. Dyrud & Margaret J. Rioch (1953) Multiple Therapy in the Treatment Program of a Mental Hospital, Psychiatry, 16:1, 21–26, DOI: 10.1080/00332747.1953.11022905
 Margaret J. Rioch (1971) “All We like Sheep-” (Isaiah 53:6): Followers and Leaders, Psychiatry, 34:3, 258–273, DOI: 10.1080/00332747.1971.11023673
 Rioch, M. J. (1966). Changing concepts in the training of therapists. Journal of Consulting Psychology, 30(4), 290–292. https://doi.org/10.1037/h00235
 Margaret J. Rioch (1986) Fifty Years at the Washington School of Psychiatry, Psychiatry, 49:1, 33-44, DOI: 10.1080/00332747.1986.11024
 Margaret J. Rioch (1970) The Work of Wilfred Bion on Groups, Psychiatry, 33:1, 56–66, DOI: 10.1080/00332747.1970.11023613
Of all her published works, her published manuscripts titled "Changing concepts in the training of therapists." and "The Work of Wilfred Bion on Groups" are debatably her most influential. These both were part of her headway into formatting the future of psychotherapy training. As previously mentioned, Rioch considered middle-aged mothers to be the most successful employees in such a field, and these papers delve deeper into her reasoning. Her work continues to influence the field of psychotherapy as a whole.

References

1907 births
1996 deaths
American University faculty and staff
Wellesley College alumni
Bryn Mawr College alumni
People from Paterson, New Jersey
American women psychologists
20th-century American psychologists
American psychotherapists
20th-century American women
American women academics